Iyengars are an ethnoreligious group with origins in the Indian states of Tamil Nadu and Karnataka.

Academicians 

 P. K. Iyengar (1931 - 2011) - nuclear physicist
 Srinivasa Ramanujan (1887 - 1920) - Indian mathematician
 A. K. Ramanujan (1929 - 1993) - Indian  poet and scholar
 S. R. Srinivasa Varadhan (b. 1940) - Indian-American probability theorist

Actors

 Vasundhara Das (b. 1977) – Indian actress and singer
 Kamal Haasan (b. 1954) Indian actor
 Charu Haasan (b. 1931) - Indian actor
 Suhasini Maniratnam (b. 1961) - Indian actress
 Anu Hasan (b. 1970) - Indian actress and talk show host
 Shruti Haasan (b. 1986) - Indian actress
 Akshara Haasan (b. 1991) - Indian actress
Amrutha Iyengar (b. 1996) - Indian actress
 Kalyan Kumar(1928-1999)- Indian actor
R. Madhavan (b. 1970)- Indian actor
Vyjayanthimala (b. 1936) - Indian actress
 Hema Malini (b. 1948) – Indian actress and Bharathnatyam exponent

Politicians & Bureaucrats

 C. V.  Rungacharlu, the 14th diwan of Mysore
 J. Jayalalithaa (1948 - 2016) – Indian actress and politician, former Chief Minister of Tamil Nadu
 C. Rajagopalachari - The last governor general of India 
 C. Rangarajan - 19th Governor of the Reserve Bank of India 
 Raghuram Rajan - 23rd Governor of the Reserve Bank of India 
 Nirmala Sitharaman - Current Finance Minister of India, Bharatiya Janata party.
 C. Vijayaraghavachariar – President, Indian National Congress.

Musicians

 Latha Rajinikanth - Film producer and playback singer
 Anirudh Ravichander - Film music composer
 T. M. Krishna -  Indian Carnatic vocalist

Scholars

 B. K. S. Iyengar (1918 - 2014) - Founder of Iyengar Yoga
 Tirumalai Krishnamacharya (1888 - 1989) - Yoga teacher, often referred to as the "Father of modern Yoga"

Sportspersons

 Krishnamachari Srikkanth - Indian cricketer and commentator

Public Service

 C. Rajagopalachari - Governor General of India

References

Lists of Indian people by community
Tamil Brahmins